Danjong of Joseon (18 August 1441 – 17 November 1457), personal name Yi Hong-wi (Korean: 이홍위; Hanja: 李弘暐), was the sixth ruler of the Joseon dynasty of Korea. He was forced to abdicate by his uncle, Grand Prince Suyang (the future King Sejo), and was put to death after being exiled to Yeongwol.

Biography
The future Danjong was born during the reign of his grandfather, King Sejong. His mother, Crown Princess Consort Gwon (posthumously honored as Queen Hyeondeok), didn’t recover after giving birth and died the next day. He had one older sister, Princess Gyeonghye, and one older half-sister, Princess Gyeongsuk.

In 1452, Yi Hong-wi succeeded his father, King Munjong, at the age of 12. Since he was too young to rule, the governing of the country fell to Chief State Councillor Hwangbo In, and Left State Councillor General Gim Jong-seo, along with Princess Gyeonghye acting as his guardian.

In 1453, this government was overthrown in a coup d'état led by his uncle, Grand Prince Suyang (posthumously called King Sejo), who persuaded a number of scholars and officials who had served in the court of Sejong the Great to support his claim to the throne. Hwangbo In and Gim Jong-seo were captured and killed in front of the gate of Gyeongbok Palace.

In late January 1454, the 14 years-old king married the 15 years-old daughter of Song Hyeon-su, Lady Song the Yeosan Song clan (later known as Queen Jeongsun). In 1455, he was forced to abdicate and became the King Emeritus of Joseon while his wife became Queen Dowager Uideok.

The following year, six court officials attempted to restore him to power, but their plot was discovered and they were immediately executed. Yi Hong-wi was later demoted to Prince Nosan (Nosan Gun; 노산군, 魯山君) and exiled to Yeongwol. His wife was also kicked out of the palace after losing her status as queen dowager and being demoted to Princess Consort Nosan (Nosan Gunbuin; 노산군부인). 

Perceiving that he would present a continuing threat to his rule, Sejo accepted the advice of the court and ordered that his nephew be disposed of. In November 1457, he was put to death.

There was an attempt to honor the late king and queen during Jungjong’s reign, but he rejected the proposal. During the reign of King Sukjong scholars once again proposed the restoration of the titles. After 200 years, in 1698, the demoted Prince Nosan and his wife were finally restored, receiving the temple name "Danjong", and posthumous name “Queen Jeongsun”.

Family
Father: King Munjong of Joseon (조선 문종) (15 November 1414 – 1 June 1452)
Grandfather: King Sejong of Joseon (조선 세종) (15 May 1397 – 8 April 1450)
Grandmother: Queen Soheon of the Cheongsong Shim clan (소헌왕후 심씨) (12 October 1395 – 19 April 1446)
Mother: Queen Hyeondeok of the Andong Gwon clan (현덕왕후 권씨) (17 April 1418 – 10 August 1441)
Grandfather: Gwon Jeon (권전) (1371 – 18 November 1441)
Grandmother: Lady Choe of the Haeju Choe clan (해주 최씨) (? – 1456)
Consorts and their respective issue(s):
 Queen Jeongsun of the Yeosan Song clan (1440 – 7 July 1521) (정순왕후 송씨)
 Royal Consort Sug-ui of the Sangsan Gim clan (1440 – 1525) (숙의 김씨)
 Royal Consort Sug-ui of the Andong Gwon clan (? – 1519) (숙의 권씨)

Ancestry

In popular culture
 Portrayed by Lee Min-woo in the 1983 MBC TV series 500 Years of Joseon: Tree with Deep roots.
Portrayed by Jung Tae-woo in the 1998–2000 KBS TV series King and Queen.
Portrayed by Noh Tae-yeob in the 2011 KBS2 TV series The Princess' Man.
 Portrayed by Chae Sang-woo in the 2011 JTBC TV series Insu, The Queen Mother and the 2013 film The 

 ah in the 2016 KBS1 TV series Jang Yeong-sil.

See also
List of monarchs of Korea
Politics of the Joseon dynasty

Notes

1441 births
1457 deaths
Child monarchs from Asia
Monarchs deposed as children
15th-century Korean monarchs
People from Seoul